Carolyn Johnson is a California-based television anchor and reporter. Until May 23, 2014 she was the co-anchor of KGO-TV San Francisco News at 6 and 11 PM Monday through Friday. She began her broadcasting career as an intern at KCBS-TV in Los Angeles, then worked as a production assistant for KGO-TV while still in college. She worked behind the scenes, producing numerous programs and specials at KGO-TV before accepting a reporting position at KSBY. She returned to KGO-TV in 1998 as a reporter and anchor.  On April 11, 2014 it was announced that Johnson was leaving KGO-TV. Johnson has co-anchored the noon and 6PM newscasts of KNBC-TV in Los Angeles since July 2014.

Carolyn has received five Emmy nominations and has been honored as best reporter by American Women in Radio and Television, Golden Gate Chapter. She's also won a Service to Children Award from the National Association of Broadcasters; the Eugene Block Journalism Award for Outstanding Coverage of San Francisco Human Rights Issues; the Arthritis Foundation Media Award; and the John Swett Award for Outstanding Locally Produced Education Series.

References

External links
KGO Official Bio
SF Gate

Living people
Television anchors from San Francisco
Year of birth missing (living people)